The Church of Christ in China was a coalition of churches in mainland China, established in the early half of the twentieth century. After missionaries were expelled from China in the 1950s, it would continue to exist primarily in the Hong Kong Council of the Church of Christ in China.

History 
The Church of Christ in China held its first general assembly in Shanghai in October 1927 with Cheng Jingyi as its first moderator, serving two terms (1927–1930 and 1930–1933). It was initially known as the Presbyterian Church of China since it brought together a number of Presbyterian and Reformed churches. However, it was renamed after it invited other church bodies in China to join the union. At the first general assembly in 1927, the following groups joined the union:

 American Board of Commissioners for Foreign Missions
 Baptist Missionary Society
 Church of Scotland
 London Missionary Society
 Presbyterian Church in Korea
 Presbyterian Church in the United States of America (North)
 Presbyterian Church in the United States (South)
 Presbyterian Church of England
 Presbyterian Church of Ireland
 Presbyterian Church of New Zealand
 Reformed Church in America
 Reformed Church in the United States
 South Fujian Conference of the Methodist Episcopal Church
 United Brethren in Christ
 United Church of Canada.

The fourth general assembly was held in Qingdao in 1937, with a total of 16 synods, 85 associations, 2842 local churches, 454 ordained ministers and approximately 130,000 communicants. The next one was never materialized due to the outbreak of World War II. After the Chinese Communist Party took over mainland China, the Hong Kong Council of the Church of Christ in China was reorganized in 1953, and is the only subdivision of the Church of Christ in China that is still running.

Ecumenical Relations 
The establishment of the Church of Christ in China was seen as an extension of the modern ecumenical movement, related to the 1910 World Missionary Conference in Edinburgh. But it also wrestled with different understandings of ecumenism and ecclesiology, which would have lasting effects on questions of church unity in mainland China until the present day.

Today, what remains of the Church of Christ in China in its Hong Kong Council is a member of Christian Conference of Asia (CCA).

See also 

 Hong Kong Council of the Church of Christ in China
 Canadian Methodist Mission
 Methodism in Sichuan
 Christianity in China
 Protestantism in China

References 

Protestantism in China
Ecclesiology